The International Primatological Society (IPS) is a scientific, educational, and charitable organization focused on non-human primates.  It encourages scientific research in all areas of study, facilitates international cooperation among researchers, and promotes primate conservation.

Together with the IUCN Species Survival Commission Primate Specialist Group (IUCN/SSC PSG) and Conservation International (CI), it jointly publishes a biannual report entitled Primates in Peril: The World's 25 Most Endangered Primates.

See also
International Journal of Primatology

References

External links
International Primatological Society - Official site

Primate conservation
Primatology
Zoology organizations
Animal conservation organizations
International scientific organizations